Tasku Shopping Centre (abbreviated Tasku) is a shopping mall in Tartu, Estonia. Next to Tasku is located Emajõe Business Centre.

Tasku was opened in 2008. The building was designed by Kalle Rõõmuse. Style of the building is Modern architectism.
Arhitektuuribüroo, and interior works were done by Vaikla Disain.

Besides many shops, Tasku accommodates also a multiplex cinema Cinamon (until 2020), Dorpat Conference Centre and a large book store (Rahva Raamat).

References

External links
 

Shopping centres in Estonia
Tartu